Brohl-Lützing is a municipality in the district of Ahrweiler in Rhineland-Palatinate, Germany.

References 

Populated places in Ahrweiler (district)